Stella Greka (Greek: Στέλλα Γκρέκα; born 1 April 1922) is a Greek singer who appeared occasionally in the cinema as an actress.

Early years 
Greka was born in Athens on April 1, 1922. One of nine children in a poor family. Her father was a set designer and had friendly relations with important people in the field, such as Pantelis Horn.

She appeared young on the music scene of the capital and from the age of 8 the Athenian press had mentioned her. In 1942 she married the poet and director Orestes Lasko, who artistically christened her Stella Greka, because she did not want to sing as Stella Lasko. He recorded a series of hits by well-known creators such as "Let's go into the unknown", "Last night", "Turn around", "Whatever you lose", "Marina's song".

Career 
Laskos convinced her to act in his film Broken Hearts (1945). Originally, Greka was going to star in G. Tzavella's Applause alongside Attikus and Dimitris Horn, but her husband turned her down in order to take part in his own film. Then, he played in the film Forgotten Faces (1946) by Tzavellas, alongside Emilios Veakis, Giorgos Pappas and Lambros Konstandaras. The director, who appeared in one scene of the play as a car driver, denounced his creation as his biggest failure. She continued her film career with only one more film, Marina, where she again took the lead role. The film, written by Sakellariou - Giannakopoulos and directed by the former, was a production of her best man Philopoimena Fino and was screened in March 1947. Greka was accompanied by Dimitris Myrat and Lambros Konstandara. It was a simple romance, which became a great success, due to Sakellario's direction and the songs performed by Greca.

Later life 
Greka, who had divorced Lasko, went to the USA in the fall of 1947, staying with her brother Angelos in New York. In 1950 she married the Greek-American John Avgerinos, who was involved in shipbuilding. She devoted herself to the family and left the issue of her career behind, therefore her involvement in singing in America was limited.

She appeared on Greek television as a guest of producer Giorgos Papastefanou. On December 16, 2013, a concert-tribute to Stella Greka was organized in Athens, curated by Michalis Koubios, with the participation of various singers, as well as the 92-year-old Stella Greka herself.

She returned to Greece in 1987 and now lives permanently in Dionysos.. She turned 100 in 2022.

References 

1922 births
Living people
20th-century Greek singers
21st-century Greek singers
Greek singers
20th-century Greek actresses
Greek film actresses
Greek stage actresses
People from Athens
Greek centenarians
Women centenarians